Llandeilo was an Urban District in Carmarthenshire between 1894 and 1974 and replaced by Dinefwr.

Election Results

1898 Election
The five members elected at the head of the poll at the initial elections now stood for re-election. One of their number, Jenkin Jones, stood down so there was no contested election.

1899 Election
Ten candidates contested this election, which was fought on party lines.

1900 Election
Only two sitting members sought re-election and they were returned at the head of the poll.

1901 Election
T.F. Powell, who ran second to Nichols three years earlier. lost his seat having been indisposed in the days before the election.

References

Urban districts of Wales
Carmarthenshire